Joseph Ellis (born 1943) is an American historian.

Joseph or Joe Ellis may also refer to:

Joe Ellis (born 1958), American football executive and president of the Denver Broncos
Joe Ellis (basketball) (born 1944), American basketball player
Joseph Ellis, stage name Zeph Ellis (born 1988), British rapper and producer
Joseph Ellis (politician), representative to the Great and General Court of Massachusetts
 Joseph Ellis Jr., representative to the Great and General Court of Massachusetts

See also
Joey Ellis (disambiguation)